Patrice Gerges is a paralympic athlete from France competing mainly in category T46 400m and 800m events.

In the 1992 Summer Paralympics Patrice competed in the 1500m but won a gold medal in the 400m, a silver in the 800m and a bronze in the long jump.  At the 1996 Summer Paralympics concentrating on the 400m and 800m he failed to match his previous achievement by winning a bronze in the 400m.

References

External links 
 

Paralympic athletes of France
Athletes (track and field) at the 1992 Summer Paralympics
Athletes (track and field) at the 1996 Summer Paralympics
Paralympic gold medalists for France
Paralympic silver medalists for France
Paralympic bronze medalists for France
Living people
Year of birth missing (living people)
Place of birth missing (living people)
Medalists at the 1992 Summer Paralympics
Medalists at the 1996 Summer Paralympics
Paralympic medalists in athletics (track and field)
French male middle-distance runners
French male long jumpers
Middle-distance runners with limb difference
Long jumpers with limb difference
Paralympic middle-distance runners
Paralympic long jumpers
20th-century French people